Raymond Blanc OBE (born 19 November 1949) is a French chef. Blanc is the chef patron at Le Manoir aux Quat' Saisons, a hotel-restaurant in Great Milton, Oxfordshire, England. The restaurant has two Michelin stars and scored 9/10 in the Good Food Guide. He is entirely self-taught, but has himself taught or employed other chefs including Heston Blumenthal, John Burton-Race, Michael Caines, Paul Liebrandt, and Marco Pierre White.

Early life
Blanc was born near Besançon, the capital of the Franche-Comté region in eastern France, between Burgundy and the Jura mountains. He grew up in Saône, a village just east of there.

While his two sisters were taught to cook by the influential Maman Blanc, his father taught Blanc and his two brothers to work in the kitchen garden. His father gave him a colander and foraging map for his 10th birthday, and what he collected his mother taught him to cook.

Career
Training as a waiter, Blanc worked at the Michelin-starred Le Palais de la Bière in Besançon. In 1972 he was fired for upsetting the head chef (Blanc had offered him advice on how to cook); however, the manager knew of a job in England.

Not speaking English well enough to survive without a notepad, he was dispatched to The Rose Revived in Newbridge, Oxfordshire, arriving three days after landing at Dover in his Renault 5 Gordini. Blanc married the owner's daughter Jenny, and the couple had two sons.

Before striking out on his own in 1977, Blanc worked for a time under chef patron André Chavagnon, who had opened a French restaurant, La Sorbonne, in Oxford High Street in 1966.

In 1977, the Blancs opened Les Quat' Saisons in a row of modern shops in Summertown, Oxford: "We mortgaged the house, owed 18 further people, and opened in a corridor between a lingerie shop and Oxfam". An overnight success, he won "Egon Ronay Guide Restaurant of the Year", two Michelin stars and a host of other distinctions.

In 1981, Blanc opened La Maison Blanc, a chain of boulangeries and pâtisseries that also contain cafès. There were 14 branches of Maison Blanc across the country, including several in London and one in Oxford. Maison Blanc cakes were also available nationwide in Waitrose supermarkets. The chain was closed in 2017 by its owners, Kout Food Group.

In 1983, Blanc purchased a manor-house in the Oxfordshire village of Great Milton where he opened Le Manoir aux Quat' Saisons, a country house hotel and double Michelin starred restaurant.  Awarded five AA stars and with a score of 19/20 from respected French guide Gault Millau, Le Manoir describes itself as "one of the ultimate gastronomic destinations in the country".

Blanc opened Le Petit Blanc, the first of a chain of smaller restaurants, in Oxford in June 1996. Blanc's stated aim with these was to bring the French philosophy of "good food being central to good living" to the United Kingdom. His desire was to create and serve food that can be enjoyed by everyone – "from the time-conscious business person to those looking for a welcoming family restaurant".

Blanc suffered two mini strokes when he was 42, believed to have been brought on by stress and overwork.

In June 2003, after nearly losing the chain to his ex-wife Jenny as part of his divorce settlement, the four Le Petit Blanc Brasseries (now known as Brasserie Blanc) in Birmingham (which closed in 2008), Cheltenham, Manchester and Oxford became part of the Loch Fyne Restaurant Group portfolio. Blanc maintains a share in the business, and continues to be involved creating new menus, developing the chef and kitchen teams and participating in the promotion of the restaurants. Since 1996, Raymond has opened the following branches of Brasserie Blanc:

 1996 - Le Petit Blanc brasserie, Oxford. Awarded one Michelin Star in its first year and classed amongst the ten best restaurants in the country, in 2006 it was re-launched as Brasserie Blanc
 1998 - Cheltenham
 1999 - Birmingham (closed 2008)
 2000 - Manchester
 2004 - Tunbridge Wells (closed 2009)
 2007 - Leeds and Milton Keynes
 2008 - Bristol and Winchester
 2009 - Portsmouth
 2010 - Chichester and Threadneedle Street, London
 2012 - Bath, Berkhamsted, St Albans and Chancery Lane, Charlotte Street, Covent Garden (closed 2016), St Paul's and Tower Hill in London

In 2012 Blanc became the president of the Sustainable Restaurant Association.

Also In 2012 Blanc became the Culinary Director for Eurostar.

In March 2013, Raymond Blanc made the news with Mayor of London Boris Johnson, to publicise a scheme to get young people into the food and hospitality industry. Blanc took on twenty-one apprentices across the Brasserie Blanc Restaurants.

Blanc is one of the patrons of the Children's Food Festival, which was held on the Northmoor Trust Estate in south Oxfordshire in June 2009.

In 2014 he presented with Kate Humble Kew on a Plate, a 4-part television series, demonstrating the garden growth and preparation of several vegetable dishes.

Chefs trained by Blanc
Blanc has taught or employed many other future chefs and restaurateurs, including: 
Sat Bains
John Burton-Race
Heston Blumenthal
Michael Caines
Elisha Carter
Éric Chavot
William Curley
Shaun Dickens
David Goodridge
Paul Heathcote
David Chalton
Marco Pierre White
Jorge Rausch
Nicholas Essex

TV appearances
Blanc has made numerous appearances on many major television stations, during prime time viewing, in the UK. These include his own series Food & Drink in 1987, Take Six Cooks in 1986 and Masterchef in 1990, 1991, 1992, 1995 and 1998, as well as The Restaurant, a BBC 2 series hosted by Blanc where nine couples competed to win their own restaurant.

Blanc was a featured chef on Great Chefs television, appearing in Great Chefs of the World.

On 13 January 2007, he appeared on Saturday Kitchen. In the Omelette Challenge, he finished last because he took the longest to cook an omelette. However, he was nudged up a few places by James Martin, right above Ken Hom, as Blanc produced a black truffle out of his pocket and garnished the finished omelette with truffle shavings.

In summer 2007, a BBC promotion for his new reality TV programme The Restaurant was shown on UK television. (The show is known to BBC America viewers in the US as Last Restaurant Standing). The promo showed a group of well-dressed diners in a slow-motion food fight, to a Gonzales backing track. The show was part of BBC Two's autumn season in 2007 and returned, with minor changes to the format, in 2008. In 2009, The Restaurant returned to BBC Two in a low-budget format. This season was much criticised for the poor standard of contestants, for neglecting the successful elements of previous series, and for Blanc choosing as the winner a team without any discernible culinary ability outside of making cocktails.

 1985 - Take Six Cooks
 1987 - Food and Drink  - Six-part series on BBC2
 1994 - Blanc Mange - Six-part BBC2 series on food and chemistry
 2000 - Friends for Dinner - Six-part BBC2 series with high-profile chefs participating in individual episodes
 2001 to 2007 - BBC Radio 4 - Discussing topical industry issues, including organic produce
 2001 - Newsnight - Foot and mouth issues - appeared with representatives from the Soil Association and the National Farmers Union
 2001 - SKY News - Relevant and topical industry issues
 2001 - Housecall  - BBC1 daytime programme, hosted by Lowri Turner. Blanc appeared on a few of the shows cooking slots.
 2002 - Passion for Perfection - Twelve-part Carlton Television series
 2004 - So What Do You Do All Day - Dedicated episode of BBC Two series, which follows a high-profile professional through a typical working day.		
 2007 - The Restaurant series 1 - Eight-part BBC Two series. Nine couples are put through their paces to see if they have what it takes to run their own restaurant.
 2008 - The Restaurant series 2 - Over eight weeks, nine couples compete to win a restaurant personally supported by Blanc.
 2009 - The Restaurant series 3
 2010 - Kitchen Secrets - BBC cookery show with a range of achievable and inspirational recipes for cooks of all abilities.
 2011 - Kitchen Secrets 2 - Second series of cookery show with a range of achievable and inspirational recipes for cooks of all abilities
 2011 - Raymond Blanc's Christmas Feast - BBC
 2012 - The Very Hungry Frenchman - BBC 2
 2013 - Raymond Blanc: How to Cook Well - Series of six half-hour programmes on BBC 2.
 2015 - Kew on a Plate
 2015 - Food and Drink - Appeared on 6 April 2015.
 2021 - Simply Raymond - Series 1; April 2021
 2022 - Simply Raymond - Series 2; January - February 2022

Blanc also made a guest appearance on the BBC sitcom Miranda in episode 5 of the third series.

Personal life
Blanc has two sons, Olivier and Sebastien. Blanc lives in Oxford with long-term partner Natalia Traxel. In 2008 he received an honorary OBE.

Bibliography
1988 - Recipes from Le Manoir aux Quat' Saisons (MacDonald Orbis) 
1994 - Mange: The Mysteries of the Kitchen Revealed 
1998 - Blanc Vite: Fast Fresh Food from Raymond Blanc (Murdoch Books) 
1999 - A Blanc Christmas (Headline) 
2002 - Foolproof French Cookery (BBC Worldwide) 
2005 - Simple French Cookery (BBC Books) 
2008 - A Taste of My Life (Bantam Press)  (autobiography)
2011 - Kitchen Secrets (Bloomsbury Publishing) 
2012 - My Kitchen Table: 100 Recipes for Entertaining (BBC Books) 
2014 - Kitchen Garden Experts' (Frances Lincoln) 
2015 - Kew on a Plate with Raymond Blanc (Headline) 
2019 - The Lost Orchard (Headline) 
2021 - Simply Raymond'' (Headline)

References

External links

 
 
 Le Manoir aux Quat' Saisons Great Milton, Oxfordshire.  RB's 2 star Michelin restaurant
 Hub UK biography
 Social Issues Research Centre article on Blanc's war on sugar
 Who's Who of Chefs information
 Interview with Raymond Blanc OBE

1949 births
Living people
Chevaliers of the Légion d'honneur
French cookbook writers
French autobiographers
French chefs
French expatriates in the United Kingdom
French food writers
French male non-fiction writers
French restaurateurs
Businesspeople from Besançon
People from Oxford
The Restaurant (British TV series)
Officers of the Order of the British Empire
Head chefs of Michelin starred restaurants